Ilford Peak (Hasho Peak II) is a peak located on the watershed of the Nangmah, Khane and Lachit valleys, Pakistan. The mountain, located in the Karakoram mountain range, is 6080 meters high. It was first climbed on July 23, 2019 by the group of Russian climbers Markevich Konstantin, Sushko Denis and Anton Ivanov.

References

See also 
 List of mountains in Pakistan

Karakoram
Mountains of Pakistan